was a free-to-play role-playing video game developed by tri-Ace and published by Square Enix for Android and iOS devices. It was created in celebration of the Star Ocean series' 20th anniversary, and features characters from all previous titles in the franchise, as well as music from series composer Motoi Sakuraba. The game was released in Japan in December 2016, and worldwide from July 2018. The global version of the game was shut down in November 2019, and the Japanese one in June 2021.

Gameplay
Star Ocean: Anamnesis is a role-playing game featuring three-dimensional characters and environments. Players take part in real-time battles against enemies that support up to four players.

Plot
Set in Space Date 539 (A.D 2625), the player controls the captain of the Pangalactic Federation starship GFSS-3214F, which was exploring deep space following the events of Star Ocean: Integrity and Faithlessness two years earlier. After a surprise attack by pirates, the entire crew jettison the vessel in escape pods while the captain stays on board with only the AI robot Coro (voiced by Ryūsei Nakao). Making the decision to activate the ship's hyperspace drive, the warp fails and ends up sending them to a distant region of space outside the Federation's borders. While investigating a seemingly barren planet, they happen upon a mysterious woman being chased by a monster. The woman, named Evelysse (voiced by Sumire Uesaka), uses a powerful form of Symbology magic that allows her to summon warriors from throughout time, and manages to escape with the aid of her time-warped allies. After she joins the captain back on the ship, the course is set to return home to the incredibly distant Earth.

Development
In October 2016, Square Enix launched a website teasing Star Ocean: Anamnesis for iOS and Android devices, and that it would feature characters seen in previous installments in the series. The company later launched an official website for the game providing the first details, preview trailer, and a release date of 2016 in Japan. A representative on the game's official Twitter account later announced that it would feature "full 3D real-time action battles" and "HD graphics." The game was meant to coincide with the series' 20th anniversary.

Producer for Square Enix Shuichi Kobayashi has stated that tri-Ace's Aska game engine, as well as backgrounds, texture and other character model data from Star Ocean: Integrity and Faithlessness were used as a base during the early phases of the game's development. As with the other games in the Star Ocean series, the game's soundtrack was composed by Motoi Sakuraba, and features artwork by Akira Yasuda, character designer for Star Ocean: Integrity and Faithlessness. The game's theme song is "Dakara Boku wa Fukou ni Sugatte Imashita" by the band Kami-sama, Boku wa Kidzuite Shimatta. The game was localized in English and released on July 10, 2018. The English version of the game was discontinued on November 5, 2019, and the Japanese version  on June 24, 2021. The game has also featured crossover events with Valkyrie Profile, Resonance of Fate, Final Fantasy Brave Exvius, Infinite Undiscovery, Nier: Automata, Radio Ocean, Sakura Wars,  Attack on Titan, Radiata Stories, Guilty Gear, Tales, Gunslinger Stratos, Million Arthur, and the Persona series.

Reception
Kotaku described the game as "exploitative but charming", praising the game's use of nostalgia, but abhorring the "blandness" of its free to play formula.

By December 2016, Anamnesis had over three million downloads.

References

External links
 
 

2016 video games
Action role-playing video games
Android (operating system) games
Delisted digital-only games
Esports games
Fantasy video games
Free-to-play video games
Inactive multiplayer online games
Inactive online games
IOS games
Products and services discontinued in 2019
Products and services discontinued in 2021
Role-playing video games
Science fantasy video games
Science fiction video games
Space opera video games
Square Enix franchises
Square Enix games
Superhero video games
Taito games
Star Ocean
Tri-Ace
Video games about robots
Video games scored by Motoi Sakuraba
Video games about parallel universes
Video games featuring female protagonists
Video games set on fictional planets
Video games set in the 27th century
Video games developed in Japan